Tajuria maculata, the spotted royal, is a species of lycaenid or blue butterfly found in Asia.

Distribution
Initially thought to be occurring in Sikkim to Peninsular Malaya, Borneo, Sumatra. Though there was a single specimen record of T. maculata from south India with the de Nicéville collection,  that Stokes Roberts took from the Nilgiris district, northwestern Tamil Nadu, southern Western Ghats (Yates 1935), it was confirmed only in 2011 by V.K. Sarkar et al. This rare butterfly was sighted again in the Nilgiris nearly a century over.

Description
In 1865, William Chapman Hewitson described this butterfly as:

Life history
The larvae feed on Dendrophthoe spp., Loranthus spp. and Viscum  spp.

See also
List of butterflies of India (Lycaenidae)

References

Butterflies of Asia
maculata
Butterflies described in 1865